August Friedrich Piepenhagen (2 August 1791, Soldin - 27 September 1868, Prague) was a German landscape painter who spent most of his career in Prague.

Biography
He came from a humble family. As a child, he was apprenticed to a button and braid maker. After becoming a journeyman, he travelled throughout Europe and was particularly impressed by Switzerland, which led him to make some attempts at painting. He stayed briefly in Zürich and took some basic lessons from Johann Heinrich Wüest, but was otherwise entirely self-taught.

The year 1811 found him in Prague, where he was hired by a button maker. After his employer died, he married his widow and took over the button business. Although successful at his trade, he began to paint more frequently and show his work at the shop. Soon, he was making more money from his paintings and had attracted the attention of the well-known landscape painter, Josef Navrátil. He also earned the admiration of the writer, Adalbert Stifter.

He had four daughters. Two of them, Charlotte and Louisa, took lessons from him and also became landscape painters.

He died on a farm just outside Prague and was originally buried at the evangelical cemetery in Karlín. Later, he was transferred to a plot at the Olšany Cemetery, which he shares with Louisa and Charlotte. The grave is adorned with a statue by the Czech sculptor, Tomáš Seidan.

Selected paintings

References

External links

August, Charlotte and Louisa Piepenhagen @ the National Gallery of Prague.

1791 births
1868 deaths
19th-century German painters
German male painters
People from Myślibórz
People from the Province of Brandenburg
19th-century German male artists